The 63 ton schooner Postboy was built at Port Adelaide in 1874. The schooner was owned by Messrs. Weman and Morgan and registered at Port Adelaide. She was a regular trading vessel between Port Adelaide and the gulf ports.

Captain James Thomas was in charge of Postboy on 15 December 1876 about 11–12 miles (20 km) off Glenelg when a sudden squall struck. She was returning from Port MacDonnell, South Australia to Port Adelaide, South Australia, with a small cargo of bark and stone ballast and seven people on board. The wind pushed the vessel bodily over and she lay on her side with sails floating in the water, resulting in the loss of 6 lives. Thomas was drowned and his body was found on Kirkcaldy Beach on 26 December 1876. His wife Sarah was pregnant with daughter Edith Emily at the time.

Postboy was refitted but was eventually wrecked at Arno Bay, South Australia after being driven ashore by a squall on 22 October 1905, and was said to have been burnt on the beach. The figurehead of Postboy is in the South Australian Maritime Museum at Port Adelaide.

The vessel One and All, built at North Haven as part of South Australia's 150th jubilee project, is based on a design of Postboy.

See also
List of shipwrecks of Australia

References

Further Information

The online collection of the State Library of South Australia includes the following image of the ship before its 1905 wrecking:
 'Port Augusta harbour on 27 September 1884 with wooden schooner Postboy loading at the end of the jetty; 1884,' at http://images.slsa.sa.gov.au/edwardes/39/PRG1373_39_2_3.htm, retrieved 03/07/2012.

External links 
 https://web.archive.org/web/20120605125814/http://www.history.sa.gov.au/maritime/maritime.htm
 https://web.archive.org/web/20030922095345/http://www.history.sa.gov.au/maritime/collections/figureheads.htm

Postboy, The
Postboy, The
Schooners
Postboy, The
Ships built in South Australia
1874 ships